Charles Percy Dixon (7 February 1873 – 29 April 1939) was a male tennis player from Great Britain. He was a four-time Olympic medallist and led a successful British team to victory in the Davis Cup.

Biography
Dixon was born on 7 February 1873 in Grantham, Lincolnshire. At the 1908 Summer Olympics in London he won a bronze medal in the men's doubles event. In the 1912 Summer Olympics he won three medals in the indoor tennis events: gold in the mixed doubles, silver in men's singles and bronze in men's doubles.

From 1929 to 1932 he represented the International Club of Great Britain against France at Queens and at Auteuil in 1932 and 1933. After retiring from tournaments, he coached juniors and umpired at Wimbledon, becoming President of the Umpire's Association. He died on 29 April 1939.

Tennis tournaments
Dixon was born in 1873, the year that Major Walter Clopton Wingfield defined the first rules for lawn tennis. Dixon reached his first all comers final at Wimbledon in 1901, beating Harold Mahony before losing to Arthur Gore. A decade later, in 1911, Dixon reached the all comers final again, beating Major Ritchie and Max Decugis before losing to Herbert Roper Barrett. He won the doubles with Roper Barrett in 1912 and 1913. 

His career included victories in international tournaments overseas include the Ostend International tournament (1905), the Doubles at the Championship of Dieppe (Championnat de Diepper) (1908) won partnering with M.J.G. Ritchie In the UK he won the Surrey Championships (1911) on grass, defeating Anthony Wilding in four sets.

He also won the Dulwich Farm Hard Courts on clay at Dulwich four times from (1909–1910, 1912–1913). He also won the Drive Club Tournament at the Drive Club, Fulham that was played on hard cement courts three times (1908-1910).

Dixon was better known at the time for his many successes when representing Britain in the Davis Cup: starting in the 1909 Cup in Philadelphia,
he led the British team to victory in the 1912 Cup in Australia. He was also a member of the English Drive Club team in South Africa in 1910–1911.

He won the 1913 Doubles title at the Russian Open Tennis Championship, partnering Albert D Prebble, and was runner up in the singles.

Grand Slam finals

Doubles (3 titles, 1 runner-ups)

Other sports
He represented Haileybury and Cambridge at racquets, winning the silver medal in 1891. He was also a keen prize-winning golfer, and represented Britain in international fencing in Paris.

His brother, J A Dixon, was captain of Nottinghamshire County Cricket Club.

In 1897 he married Louise Robinson, and until his death they lived at Chestnut Road, West Norwood.

He died on 29 April 1939 in West Norwood, London.

After cremation his ashes were buried nearby at the Robinson family plot in West Norwood Cemetery.

References

External links
 
 
 
 

1873 births
1939 deaths
Australasian Championships (tennis) champions
Burials at West Norwood Cemetery
English male fencers
English racquets players
English male tennis players
English Olympic medallists
Olympic bronze medallists for Great Britain
Olympic gold medallists for Great Britain
Olympic silver medallists for Great Britain
Olympic tennis players of Great Britain
People from Grantham
Tennis players at the 1908 Summer Olympics
Tennis players at the 1912 Summer Olympics
Wimbledon champions (pre-Open Era)
Olympic medalists in tennis
Grand Slam (tennis) champions in men's doubles
Medalists at the 1908 Summer Olympics
Medalists at the 1912 Summer Olympics
British male tennis players
Tennis people from Lincolnshire